Greg Osby and Sound Theatre is the debut studio album by saxophonist Greg Osby recorded in 1987 and released on the JMT label.

Reception
The AllMusic review by Scott Yanow states, "The performances (mostly Osby originals) are complex, somewhat abrasive, and in the M-Base genre, swinging in their own funky fashion and following a different logic than bebop. Osby plays quite well, and the music grows in interest with each listen".

Track listing
All compositions by Greg Osby except as indicated
 "You Big ..." - 5:07  
 "Daigoro" - 7:48  
 "Return to Now" - 7:51  
 "Shohachi Bushi/Oyamako Bushi" (Traditional) - 3:09  
 "Calculated Risk" - 3:52  
 "For Real Moments" (Geri Allen) - 7:12  
 "Gyrhythmitoid" - 5:32  
 "Knigrobade" - 6:34 Bonus track on CD

Personnel
Band
Greg Osby - alto saxophone, soprano saxophone
Michele Rosewoman - piano, synthesizer  (tracks 1-3 & 5-7)
Kevin McNeal  - electric guitar, acoustic guitar (tracks 1-3 & 5-7)
Lonnie Plaxico - bass (tracks 1-3 & 5-8)
Paul Samuels - drums, percussion (tracks 2-5 & 7)

Special guests
Fusako Yoshida  - koto (tracks 2 & 4)
Terri Lyne Carrington - drums, percussion (tracks 4, 7 & 8)
Haruko Nara - lyrics (track 2)

References 

1987 debut albums
Greg Osby albums
JMT Records albums
Winter & Winter Records albums